BYJ may refer to:

 Beja Airport, Portugal (by IATA code)
 Bina language, spoken in Nigeria (by ISO 639 code)
 Bae Yong-joon, Korean actor